"Hot Love" is a 1990 single by British pop group Five Star, the second release for their new record label, Epic. Peaking at #68, this track would be the group's last appearance in the UK Top 75 to date.

The group recorded the single in their new hi-tech studio that was built in the grounds of their family home, Stone Court, in Ascot, Berkshire. The single proved a flop, and the press were quick to pounce, claiming Five Star's career was rapidly fading. After the single's release, the album Five Star, was shelved by Epic, and merited only a U.S. release, although the album was made available in Britain on import towards the end of 1990. After a third single, "Shine" (released in 1991) failed to chart, the band left Epic and pursued a career in the United States.

The video to the single was hardly shown on British TV. The video was shot in a mock coffee shop called "Joe's Bar", in which the band performed a dance routine.

The group did promote the song on TV, appearing on the Terry Wogan chat show with a dance routine.

Track listings

7" Single, 7" postcard pack and cassette single:

 Hot Love
 Act One

12" Single:

 Hot Love (Extended Version)
 Hot Love (Full Rub)

UK promo 12" Single: [feat. Miss D]

 Hot Love (Full Rub)  5:56
 Hot Love (Instrumental)  5:14
 Hot Love (Bonus Rub)  5:30

CD Single:

 Hot Love
 Hot Love (Extended Version)
 Act One

3" CD Single:

 Hot Love (Extended Version)
 Hot Love (Full Rub)

All tracks available on the remastered version of the 2013 'Five Star' album.

References

Five Star songs
1990 singles
Songs written by Delroy Pearson
Songs written by Doris Pearson
1990 songs
Epic Records singles